Grantsville National Forest was established as the Grantsville Forest Reserve by the General Land Office in Utah on May 6, 1904  with .  After the transfer of federal forests to the U.S. Forest Service in 1905, it became a National Forest on March 4, 1907. On July 1, 1908 Grantsville was combined with Wasatch National Forest and the name was discontinued. The lands are presently included in Uinta-Wasatch-Cache National Forest.

References

External links
Forest History Society
Listing of the National Forests of the United States and Their Dates (from Forest History Society website) Text from Davis, Richard C., ed. Encyclopedia of American Forest and Conservation History. New York: Macmillan Publishing Company for the Forest History Society, 1983. Vol. II, pp. 743-788.

Former National Forests of Utah